A desmolase is any of various enzymes that catalyze the formation or destruction of carbon-carbon bonds within a molecule. These enzymes play a significant role in cellular respiration and in fermentation. Desmolases are involved in steroidogenesis.
 
Examples of desmolases are:
Cholesterol side-chain cleavage enzyme, also called 20,22-desmolase; converts cholesterol to pregnenolone.
 17,20-Desmolase, also called CYP17A1 or 17α-hydroxylase; converts pregnenolone to 17α-hydroxypregnenolone, progesterone to 17α-hydroxyprogesterone, and corticosterone to aldosterone.
Diacetyl desmolase is added to beer late in the brewing process to remove diacetyl flavor that may have accumulated during processing.

See also
 Steroidogenic enzyme

References

Enzymes